George Clifford (19 April 1852 – 4 February 1941) was an English cricketer. He played sixteen first-class matches for Surrey between 1871 and 1879.

See also
 List of Surrey County Cricket Club players

References

External links
 

1852 births
1941 deaths
Cricketers from Greater London
English cricketers
London United Eleven cricketers
People from Barnes, London
Surrey cricketers